Sunan Giri (also called Raden Paku or Joko Samudro), Muhammad Ainul Yakin (born 1442 CE in Blambangan (now Banyuwangi) is considered one of the Wali Sanga (revered saints of Islam) of Indonesia.

History 

He was the son of Dewi Sekardadu and Maulana Ishak of Melaka (brother of Maulana Malik Ibrahim), and later adopted as a son by Nyai Gede Pinatih, a female merchant. A traditional story says that he was the son of a Hindu princess who had come to Blambangan as a missionary, who was forced to abandon him in a crisis by setting him adrift on the ocean in a small boat from which he was rescued by sailors—a story reminiscent of the biblical Moses. (see Sejarah Banten).

Education and contributions

As a young man, Giri studied in the school of Sunan Ampel, whose daughter he eventually married, and where Raden Patah was his fellow student.

The Islamic school he established was not only an institute of religious studies, but a center for local civic activities and social development.

Political leadership 

The king of Majapahit granted Giri the authority to expand his role in political leadership, which later on to lead to the greater development of the school, popularly known as Giri Kedaton. Sunan Giri was also known as Prabu Satmata, due to his remarkable record.

Sunan Giri foretold the rise of Mataram, and spread Islam to Lombok, Sulawesi, and Maluku. He was a proponent of orthodox Islam, and disapproved of innovation (much like "modernist" Islamic scholars of the 1800s and 1900s).

Later history of the Giri Kedaton school

Giri Kedaton, as a center of religious and political authority led by century head Pangeran Singosari was known for his most persistent resistance to the Dutch VOC and to Amangkurat II, who collaborated with the Dutch colonization efforts.

The creation of popular Javanese traditional games and children's toys and games such as Jelungan, Jamuran, lir-ilir and Cublak Suweng is attributed to Sunan Giri. His name is also associated with Gending Asmaradana and Pucung (Javanese poetry)—although they had been mostly influenced by pre-Islamic Javanese beliefs and traditions, but show signs of eventual Islamization.

See also
Islam in Indonesia
The spread of Islam in Indonesia (1200 to 1600)
Ali al-Uraidhi ibn Ja'far al-Sadiq

References

Sunyoto, Agus (2014). Atlas Wali Songo: Buku Pertama yang Mengungkap Wali Songo Sebagai Fakta Sejarah. 6th edition. Depok: Pustaka IIMaN.

External links
http://www.petra.ac.id/eastjava/walisongo/giri.htm

Wali Sanga
1442 births
1506 deaths
Indonesian people of Malay descent